On 9 March 2015, two Eurocopter AS350 Écureuil helicopters collided mid-air near Villa Castelli, Argentina, killing all ten people on board both aircraft.

The helicopters had just departed together from the same spot and collided during the initial climb-out. They were transporting production staff and guests for the French reality TV series Dropped, and among the victims were French sailor Florence Arthaud, swimmer Camille Muffat and boxer Alexis Vastine.

Background

The French television channel TF1 was filming an episode of Dropped, a reality TV show that takes celebrities to a hostile environment by helicopter and films their efforts to survive. The cast comprised various Olympic medallists and international sportspeople, including French athletes Alain Bernard, Philippe Candeloro, Jeannie Longo, and Sylvain Wiltord, plus Arthaud, Muffat and Vastine; Swiss athlete Anne-Flore Marxer was also taking part.

At the time of the accident, Wiltord had already been eliminated from the competition and was back in France.

Collision
Each helicopter was carrying four passengers in addition to the pilot.

A video of the accident appears to show the lower of the two helicopters climbing at a higher rate than the other one, colliding with it from below. Weather conditions at the time were reported as good.

Aircraft
The two aircraft involved were both Eurocopter AS350B3 Écureuil; one was registered LQ-CGK, the other LQ-FJQ. LQ-CGK was manufactured in 2010 and was owned by the provincial government of La Rioja. LQ-FJQ was manufactured in 2012 and was owned by the provincial government of Santiago del Estero.

Victims
All ten people on board both aircraft were killed in the accident, including French athletes Florence Arthaud, Camille Muffat and Alexis Vastine. The others killed were the two Argentinian pilots and five French members of the production team, Adventure Line Productions. The other show contestants were reported to have been waiting on the ground nearby when the accident occurred.

Reactions
François Hollande, President of France, said, "The sudden death of our fellow French nationals is a cause of immense sadness."
Sylvain Wiltord tweeted, "I'm sad for my friends, I'm trembling, I'm horrified, I have no words, I don't want to say anything."
TF1 issued a statement saying, "All TF1 teams come together in this terrible time with the pain of the families and relatives of the victims."

Investigation
The Junta de Investigaciones de Accidentes de Aviación Civil (JIAAC), Argentina's state body in charge of air accident inquires, opened an investigation, assisted by the French counterpart Bureau d'Enquêtes et d'Analyses pour la Sécurité de l'Aviation Civile (BEA). French prosecutors also opened a case.

The deputy leader of the Radical Civic Union party stated that LQ-CGK was an official helicopter of La Rioja province, only meant to be used for medical emergencies. Governor Luis Beder Herrera confirmed this statement and stated that the helicopter had been "lent" to a tourism company.

The final report, released in Spanish, English and French, determined the factors related to the accident as:

See also
 List of civilian mid-air collisions

References

External links
 "JIAAC – Accidente de helicópteros en Villa Castelli – La Rioja" (Archive)
 "Un equipo de JIAAC investiga el accidente de helicópteros en La Rioja" (Archive)
 "BEA – Accident in Argentina, between two Airbus Helicopters AS 350’s on Monday 9 March 2015" (Archive)
  Helicopters crash, killing stars of French reality TV show
  France mourns sports stars killed in Argentina helicopter crash
 Top French athletes among 10 dead after 2 helicopters collide in Argentina

2015 in Argentina
2015 in France
Accidents and incidents involving the Eurocopter AS350
Aviation accidents and incidents in 2015
Aviation accidents and incidents in Argentina
La Rioja Province, Argentina
Mid-air collisions
Mid-air collisions involving helicopters
March 2015 events in South America